This is a list of New Zealand's international rankings on a range of social, economic and other criteria.

Political and economic rankings

Ease of Doing Business Index, ranked 1st overall in 2019 out of 185 countries, 1st in the sub-categories of Starting a Business and Getting Credit.
Political freedom ratings – Free; political rights and civil liberties both rated 1 (the highest score available)
Press freedom – Ranked 8th for press freedom at 1.50.
GDP per capita – 29th highest (2016), at I$36,172
Human Development Index – 14th highest (2020), at 0.931
Income Equality – 54th most equal, at 36.2 (Gini Index)
Literacy Rate – 10th equal at 99.0%
Unemployment rate – 48th lowest, at 4.0%.
Global Peace Index – 2nd at 1.253
Corruption – Least corrupt, at 9.4 on Corruption Perceptions Index
Economic Freedom – 4th freest, at 80.6 on Index of Economic Freedom (2022), and 3rd, at 8.28 on Economic Freedom of the World index
Fragile States Index, 172/177, being one of the few "sustainable" states in the world.

Health rankings
Fertility rate- 155th most fertile, at 1.79 per woman
Birth rate – 140th most births, at 13.90 per 1000 people
Infant mortality – 169th most deaths, at 5.85 per 1000 live births
Death rate – 123rd highest death rate, at 7.52 per 1000 people
Life Expectancy – 17th highest, at 81.6 years (2015)
Suicide Rate – 72nd highest suicide rate, at 14.4 for males and 5.0 for females per 100,000 people (2014)
HIV/AIDS rate – 133rd highest percentage out of 162 countries, at 0.1%
Obesity rate – 22nd highest obesity rate out of 191 countries, at 30.8% according to The World Factbook.

In 2005 the International Agency for Research on Cancer found New Zealand men and women to have the third highest cancer rates in the world.

In 2012, New Zealand had the 12th highest rate of cancer out of the 34 OECD countries.

Other rankings
CO2 emissions – 50th highest emissions, at 7.8 tonnes per capita
Electricity Consumption – 48th highest consumption of electricity, at 37,030,000,000 kWh
Broadband Internet access – 15th highest uptake in OECD, at 29.5%
List of countries by beer consumption per capita – 32nd highest out of 58 countries, at 62.7 litres per capita (2014)
Environmental Performance Index – Comprising; Environmental health, air quality, water resources, biodiversity and habitat, productive natural resources, Sustainable energy – 7th out of 80 countries, at 88.9/100
Legatum Global Prosperity Index – Ranked most prosperous country in the world (2016)
Ease of paying tax – 9th easiest
Imprisonment rate – 68th highest out of 217, at 202 prisoners per 100,000 people (2016)
List of countries by intentional homicide rate – 191st out of 218 countries (27th lowest rate)
Victimisation rate – 3rd highest out of 30, with 21.5% of people aged 16 or more being victims
Top Country Award – Won the honor two years in a row (2007, 2008) from Wanderlust Magazine
Good Country Index – Ranked 5th out of 195. Based on the goodness of a nation
Better Life Index – Ranked 7th (2016) of the 34 OECD countries based on statistics and perceptions of quality of life

See also
List of international rankings

References

External links

New Zealand